The Philippines Daily Express, commonly known as the Daily Express, was a daily newspaper in the Philippines. It was better known for circulating propagandist news articles related to then-President Ferdinand Marcos during the time of his regime. Its Sunday edition was known as the Philippines Sunday Express.

History
It was founded on May 9, 1972, by entrepreneur and Marcos crony Roberto Benedicto. The newspaper was re-opened a few days after Marcos declared martial law, wherein most media and newspaper outlets who were critical against the latter were closed and taken over by the military. Benedicto assigned Enrique Romualdez, a relative of first lady Imelda Marcos, as chief editor of the paper to ensure that it held the views of the regime.

After the EDSA People Power Revolution in 1986, which signaled the end of Marcos regime, most of the assets owned by Marcos's cronies were sequestered by the government under Aquino administration, including Daily Express. The newspaper ceased publication in 1987.

References

English-language newspapers published in the Philippines
Publications established in 1972
National newspapers published in the Philippines
Newspapers published in Metro Manila
Defunct newspapers published in the Philippines
Defunct daily newspapers
Daily newspapers published in the Philippines